Land of the Sun may refer to:

 Land of the Sun (Middle-earth), an area of Arda, in J. R. R. Tolkien's Middle-earth legendarium
 Land of the Sun (album), an album by American jazz musician Charlie Haden
 "Land of the Sun" (song), a song by Alexander "Skip" Spence